Usson-du-Poitou (literally Usson of the Poitou) is a commune in the Vienne department in the Nouvelle-Aquitaine region in western France.

Geography
The Clouère flows north through the middle of the commune and crosses the village.

See also
Communes of the Vienne department

References

Communes of Vienne